Satrumun Kidaitha Thagaval is a 2009 Indian Tamil-language thriller film directed by Bhuvanai Kannan. The film stars Kanal Kannan, fame Bharathi, Khushbu, Livingston, and K. S. Ravikumar. The film was released on 30 January 2009.

Plot 
A sequence of murder takes place in the city and a cop steps in to investigate them. Meanwhile, Shiva leaves a mental asylum. It is concluded that a lunatic is behind all these murders. Siva (Kanal Kannan) manages to enter the house of a film director (Livingston). His wife is all alone. She suspects him to be the mentally-challenged man on murder trail. Meanwhile, the police zeroes in on a psychiatrist doctor (Khushbu) to be responsible for the murder. In the court, she spills the beans that a young girl who had a disturbed childhood was indeed responsible for the deaths, she is shown to have been molested by a police officer, her first adoptive father. Shiva eventually discovers that it was none other than the film director's wife. What the noble-hearted Shiva does to bring her back to normal life forms the rest.

Cast 
Kanal Kannan as Siva
Bharathi as Meera
Khushbu as Radha
Livingston
K. S. Ravikumar
Sethu
Meenakshi
Shathiga
Babilona
Roshika
T. P. Gajendran
Mohan V. Raman
Naren
Nambiraj
Natesh
Siddharth

Production 
The film marked the debut of Kanal Kannan as lead actor. Thakkali Srinivasan was initially chosen to be the director but was replaced midway through production by a debutant director, Bhuvanai Kannan.

Soundtrack 
Soundtrack was composed by newcomer Bala.
"Sei Sei" – Karthik, Madhumitha
"Pichavaram" – Tippu
"Konjam" – Harish Raghavendra, Chinmayi
"Rojavanam" – Anuradha Sriram

Critical reception 
The Hindu wrote "The script lacks cohesion and many questions remain unanswered. Every main character has a past and the director’s bid to weave them into the story results in utter confusion."

References 

2009 films
2000s Tamil-language films
Indian thriller films
2009 directorial debut films
2009 thriller films